Bolivia–Turkey relations are foreign relations between Bolivia and Turkey. Turkey has had an embassy in La Paz since February 14, 2018. In September 2022, Bolivia opened an embassy in Ankara.

Agreements 
The two countries signed an agreement on visa exemption in 2000. An economic and commercial cooperation agreement was signed in 2011.

Presidential visits
The official visit of former President Evo Morales to Turkey on 9 April 2019 was the first presidential visit between the two countries.

Economic relations
The trade volume between the two countries was approximately 130 million USD (Turkey’s exports: 22 million USD, Turkey’s imports: 108 million USD) by the end of 2019.

See also 

 Foreign relations of Bolivia
 Foreign relations of Turkey

References 

 
Turkey
Bilateral relations of Turkey